Dmytro Oleksandrovych Zhykol (born 26 January 1995) is a Ukrainian professional footballer who plays as a central midfielder.

References

External links
 Profile on Moravian-Silesian Football League official website
 
 

1995 births
Living people
Footballers from Kyiv
Ukrainian footballers
Association football midfielders
FC Arsenal Kyiv players
FC Sevastopol players
FC Dynamo Kyiv players
FC Dynamo-2 Kyiv players
1. SK Prostějov players
SC Chaika Petropavlivska Borshchahivka players
FC Podillya Khmelnytskyi players
Ukrainian First League players
Ukrainian Second League players
Czech National Football League players
Moravian-Silesian Football League players
Ukrainian expatriate sportspeople in the Czech Republic
Ukrainian expatriate footballers
Expatriate footballers in the Czech Republic